Bradley "Brad" McCuaig (born 12 December 1970) is a Canadian retired sprinter who specialized in the 100 metres. McCuaig was born in Calgary, Alberta.

In the 4 × 100 metres relay event he finished fourth at the 1998 IAAF World Cup and won a silver medal at the 1999 Pan American Games.

His personal best time is 10.10 seconds, achieved in July 1998 in Flagstaff.

McCuaig competed at the 2000 Summer Olympics in the men's 4×100m relay.

References

External links
 
 
 
 
 
 

1970 births
Athletes (track and field) at the 2000 Summer Olympics
Living people
Olympic track and field athletes of Canada
Athletes from Calgary
Canadian male sprinters
Athletes (track and field) at the 1999 Pan American Games
Athletes (track and field) at the 1998 Commonwealth Games
Commonwealth Games medallists in athletics
Commonwealth Games silver medallists for Canada
Pan American Games medalists in athletics (track and field)
Pan American Games silver medalists for Canada
Goodwill Games medalists in athletics
World Athletics Championships athletes for Canada
Competitors at the 1990 Goodwill Games
Competitors at the 1998 Goodwill Games
Medalists at the 1999 Pan American Games
Medallists at the 1998 Commonwealth Games